Utetheisa transiens is a moth in the family Erebidae. It was described by Jan Hendrick Jurriaanse and Johannus Lindemans in 1919. It is found in the Tukangbesi Islands of Indonesia.

References

Moths described in 1919
transiens